Too Many Humans..... is the debut studio album by the American noise rock band No Trend, released through their own No Trend Records in 1984 on vinyl format. The album is known for its brash, misanthropic lyrics, as evident on tracks such as "Reality Breakdown" and "Mindless Little Insects". It has been described as "nightmarish" and has been compared to other noisy bands such as Flipper and Public Image Ltd.

The album was long thought to never be reissued due to the supposed destruction of the original master tapes. However, on May 29, 2020, Drag City released a box set reissue and remaster of the album, along with both versions of Teen Love.

Music and lyrics
The album has been described as violent, misanthropic, noisy, and mean-spirited. Most lyrics mock punk subculture and the social normalities of human life; such as marriage, fashion, and so on. As vocalist Jeff Mentges mentioned in an interview:

...I've always been confused by why what music you listen to would dictate what kind of clothes you wear or what color your hair is. If there's a philosophy in the music you like, you can live by that, but I don't see why you have to be part of a clique, a scene, a movement.

The music heavily centers around Jack Anderson's basslines, while Frank Price's guitar riffs are mostly composed of high pitched guitar feedback. The closer track, "Happiness Is...", features multiple different looped sound samples, layered over a funk-influenced instrumental. The song "For the Fun of It All" would later be rerecorded for the band's follow-up album A Dozen Dead Roses.

Track listing

Personnel
Jeff Mentges - Vocals
Jack Anderson - Bass
Frank Price - Guitar
Greg Miller - Drums

References

External links 
 

1984 debut albums
No Trend albums